The Witch Hunt is a 1981 Norwegian drama film  written and directed by Anja Breien. 
 
The film was entered into the main competition at the 38th edition of the Venice Film Festival.

Plot

Cast 
 
Lil Terselius as Eli Laupstad  
Bjørn Skagestad  as  Aslak Gimra  
Anita Björk as Ingeborg Eriksdotter Jaatun  
Erik Mørk  as Henrik Ravn  
Ella Hval as  Guri  
 Mona Jacobsen as  Maren 
Espen Skjønberg  as  Kristoffer Klomber  
 Eilif Armand as  Rasmus Knag 
Jan Hårstad  as Njell Asserson 
Lars Andreas Larssen  as Glaser  
 Cay Kristiansen as  Bolle 
Jens Okking as Blomme  
Jorunn Kjellsby  as Dordi 
 Häge Juve as  Sigrid 
Lothar Lindtner  as   Asser

References

External links

1981 drama films
1981 films
Films directed by Anja Breien
Norwegian drama films
1980s Norwegian-language films
Films scored by Arne Nordheim